The Ontario Pension Board in Canada is an independent organization responsible for administering defined-benefit pensions for certain employees of the provincial government and its agencies, boards, and commissions.

History
Ontario Pension Board was established in the early 1920s.

Organization
The plan administers the pensions for some 44,000 members, and it pays pensions to some 39,000 retired members (and 6,600 deferred retirees).

References

External links
 

Public pension funds in Canada
Investment companies of Canada
Private equity firms of Canada
Organizations based in Toronto
Infrastructure investment